Luis Calvo is a province in the Bolivian department of Chuquisaca.

Subdivision 
The province is divided into three municipalities which are further subdivided into cantons. The municipalities with their seats are:

References

Provinces of Chuquisaca Department